Annals of Physics is a monthly peer-reviewed scientific journal covering all aspects of physics. It was established in 1957 and is published by Elsevier. The editor-in-chief is Neil Turok (University of Edinburgh School of Physics and Astronomy).

Abstracting and indexing
The journal is abstracted and indexed in: 

According to the Journal Citation Reports, the journal has a 2020 impact factor of 2.73.

References

External links 
 

Physics journals
Monthly journals
Publications established in 1957
English-language journals
Elsevier academic journals